The Lady of Lebanon (French: La châtelaine du Liban) is a 1926 French silent drama film directed by Marco de Gastyne and starring Arlette Marchal, Iván Petrovich and Gaston Modot. It was based on the novel of the same name by Pierre Benoît.

Cast
 Arlette Marchal as Countess Orloff  
 Iván Petrovich as Captain Lucien Domèvre  
 Gaston Modot as Ahmed Said 
 Marcel Soarez as Captain Walter  
 Choura Milena as Michelle Hannequin  
 Nathalie Greuze
 Henri Étiévant as Colonel Hannequin  
 Georges Paulais
 Maurice Salvany 
 Mitchell 
 Camille Bert as Colonel Prieur  
 Max Dejean

See also
 The Lady of Lebanon, a 1934 film based on the same novel
 The Lebanese Mission, a 1956 film based on the same novel

References

Bibliography 
 Dayna Oscherwitz & MaryEllen Higgins. The A to Z of French Cinema. Scarecrow Press, 2009.

External links 
 

1926 films
French silent films
1920s French-language films
Films based on works by Pierre Benoit
Films directed by Marco de Gastyne
Pathé films
French black-and-white films
French drama films
1926 drama films
Films based on French novels
Silent drama films
1920s French films